Sekolah Menengah Kebangsaan Bukit Bandaraya (SMKBB) is a government-aided co-educational secondary school located in Bangsar, Kuala Lumpur, Malaysia.

From 2012 to 2014, they won the under-14 Schools High Performance Sports Championship for hockey.

Sports houses
 Bendahara (Yellow)
 Laksamana (Blue)
 Syahbandar (Red)
 Temenggung (Green)

References

Educational institutions established in 1985
Secondary schools in Kuala Lumpur
1985 establishments in Malaysia